What Happened Was... is a 1994 American independent film written for the screen, directed by and starring Tom Noonan. It is an adaptation of Noonan's original stage play of the same name.

Premise 
The film depicts two people, played by Karen Sillas and Tom Noonan, on a first date; their conversation gradually reveals their lonely lives and hidden personalities.

Reception 
What Happened Was... has an overall approval rating of 91% on Rotten Tomatoes.

On the Siskel & Ebert show, Gene Siskel gave the film a thumbs up, stating that "For what is really just one long night of conversation, the stakes and the tension couldn't be any higher if these were two characters having a more conventional action scene."  Roger Ebert, however, gave the film a thumbs down, calling it "Contrived" and stating that "There is a lot less here than meets the eye." The film is a favourite of filmmaker Charlie Kaufman.

Year-end lists 
 10th – Todd Anthony, Miami New Times
 Top 9 (not ranked) – Dan Webster, The Spokesman-Review
 Top 10 (listed alphabetically, not ranked) – Jimmy Fowler, Dallas Observer
 "The second 10" (not ranked) – Sean P. Means, The Salt Lake Tribune
 Honorable mention – Howie Movshovitz, The Denver Post
 Honorable mention – Jeff Simon, The Buffalo News

Accolades 
It won the Grand Jury Prize and the Waldo Salt Screenwriting Award at the 1994 Sundance Film Festival. Noonan was nominated for Best First Screenplay and Karen Sillas for Best Female Lead at the 10th Independent Spirit Awards.

References

External links 
 
 
 Official trailer on YouTube

1994 films
American independent films
1990s English-language films
1990s romantic comedy-drama films
American romantic comedy-drama films
The Samuel Goldwyn Company films
1994 independent films
American films based on plays
1990s American films